March 23 - Eastern Orthodox liturgical calendar - March 25

All fixed commemorations below are observed on April 6 by Eastern Orthodox Churches on the Old Calendar.

For March 24th, Orthodox Churches on the Old Calendar commemorate the Saints listed on March 11.

Feasts

 Forefeast of the Annunciation.

Saints

 Saint Artemon, Bishop of Seleucia in Pisidia (1st century)
 Hieromartyr Artemon, presbyter of Laodicea (284-305)  (see also: April 12, April 13)
 Martyr Timolaus and 7 Companions with him (8 Martyrs), in Caesarea Palaestina, by beheading (305)
 Venerable Zachariah the Recluse, of Egypt (4th century)
 Venerable Martin of the Thebaid, monk.
 Venerable Abraham of Mount Latros, ascetic.
 Saint Thomas, Abbot of the monastery of St. Euthymius (542)
 Venerable Jacob of Catania (James the Confessor), Bishop of Catania (c. 730)
 Saint Severus of Catania, Bishop of Catania (c. 812)

Pre-schism Western saints
 Saint Flavius Latinus of Brescia, third Bishop of Brescia in Italy (84-115)
 Martyrs Romulus and Secundus, brothers, in Mauritania (Barbary), who suffered for the faith of Christ.
 Saint Pigmenius, a priest in Rome thrown into the Tiber under Julian the Apostate (362)
 Saint Domangard (Donard), patron of Maghera in Co. Down in Ireland, who lived as a hermit on the mountain now called Slieve-Donard after him (c. 500)
 Saint Macartan (Macartin, Maccarthen, Mac Cairthinn of Clogher), an early disciple and companion of St Patrick of Ireland, who consecrated him Bishop of Clogher (c. 505)
 Saint Cairlon (Caorlan, Carláen), an abbot in Ireland who became Archbishop of Armagh (588)
 Saint Caimin of Inis Cealtra (Holy Island) on Lough Derg, Bishop-Abbot of Inis Cealtra and possibly the first Bishop of Killaloe (653)  (see also: March 25)
 Saint Hildelith, Abbess of Barking Abbey (c. 712)

Post-schism Orthodox saints
 Venerable Zachariah, Faster of the Kiev Caves (12th century)
 Martyrs Stephen and Peter of Kazan (1552)
 New Hieromartyr Parthenius III, Patriarch of Constantinople (1657)
 Venerable Savvas the New of Kalymnos (1947)  (see also: March 25 or April 7; fifth Sunday of Great Lent)

New martyrs and confessors
 New Hieromartyr Vladimir Pankin, Priest, of Chimkent (1920)

Other commemorations

 Synaxis of the Icon of the Theotokos "The Clouded Mountain" (also "the Uncut Mount" or "Smoky Mountain"), in Tver.
 Commemoration of the miracle at the Kiev Caves Lavra.

Icon gallery

Notes

References

Sources
 March 24/April 6. Orthodox Calendar (PRAVOSLAVIE.RU).
 April 6 / March 24. HOLY TRINITY RUSSIAN ORTHODOX CHURCH (A parish of the Patriarchate of Moscow).
 March 24. OCA - The Lives of the Saints.
 The Autonomous Orthodox Metropolia of Western Europe and the Americas (ROCOR). St. Hilarion Calendar of Saints for the year of our Lord 2004. St. Hilarion Press (Austin, TX). p. 24.
 March 24. Latin Saints of the Orthodox Patriarchate of Rome.
 The Roman Martyrology. Transl. by the Archbishop of Baltimore. Last Edition, According to the Copy Printed at Rome in 1914. Revised Edition, with the Imprimatur of His Eminence Cardinal Gibbons. Baltimore: John Murphy Company, 1916. pp. 85-86.
 Rev. Richard Stanton. A Menology of England and Wales, or, Brief Memorials of the Ancient British and English Saints Arranged According to the Calendar, Together with the Martyrs of the 16th and 17th Centuries. London: Burns & Oates, 1892. p. 131.
Greek Sources
 Great Synaxaristes:  24 ΜΑΡΤΙΟΥ. ΜΕΓΑΣ ΣΥΝΑΞΑΡΙΣΤΗΣ.
  Συναξαριστής. 24 Μαρτίου. ECCLESIA.GR. (H ΕΚΚΛΗΣΙΑ ΤΗΣ ΕΛΛΑΔΟΣ). 
Russian Sources
  6 апреля (24 марта). Православная Энциклопедия под редакцией Патриарха Московского и всея Руси Кирилла (электронная версия). (Orthodox Encyclopedia - Pravenc.ru).
  24 марта (ст.ст.) 6 апреля 2013 (нов. ст.). Русская Православная Церковь Отдел внешних церковных связей. (DECR). 

March in the Eastern Orthodox calendar